Mad Genius is a 2017 American science fiction film written and directed by Royce Gorsuch and starring Chris Mason, Scott Mechlowicz, Spencer Locke and Faran Tahir.  It is Gorsuch's feature directorial debut.

Cast
Chris Mason as Mason
Scott Mechlowicz as Finn
Spencer Locke as Sawyer
Faran Tahir as Eden

Release
The film was released on VOD on July 3, 2018.

Reception
Adam Keller of Film Threat awarded the film a 4 out of 10.

References

External links
 
 

American science fiction films
2017 science fiction films
2010s English-language films
2010s American films